is a Japanese voice actor. After watching Rika Matsumoto perform Ash Ketchum, Sakai decided he wanted to be a voice actor, which he did and made his debut in 2013. Some of the major roles Sakai has had since are Mitsumune in The Lost Village, Nobunaga Oda in Nobunaga Teacher's Young Bride, Sakuya Sakuma in A3!, and Shaun in Shadows House.

Biography
Kōdai Sakai was born in Kurume on September 30, 1986. In elementary school, Sakai was a fan of the Pokémon series, especially Rika Matsumoto's performance as Ash Ketchum, which would inspire him to become a voice actor. While working as a salaryman, he started watching anime again, which inspired to try voice acting again and quit his current job. He was later hired by Early Wing, where he made his voice acting debut as a caretaker in Karneval. In 2016, he received his first lead role with The Lost Village.

In 2020, Sakai won the game award at the 14th Seiyu Awards.

Filmography

TV series
2015
 Brave Beats as Flash Beat

2016
 The Lost Village as Mitsumune
 All Out!! as Michio Sumiyoshi

2017
 King's Game The Animation as Toshiyuki Fujioka

2018
 Captain Tsubasa as Teppei Kisugi & Nishigaoka Soccer Club Member A (episode 3)
 The Master of Ragnarok & Blesser of Einherjar as Yuuto Suoh

2019
 Nobunaga Teacher's Young Bride as Nobunaga Oda

2020
 A3! as Sakuya Sakuma

2021
 Shadows House as Shaun
 Odd Taxi as Shun Imai

2022
 Shadows House 2nd Season as Shaun

Other
 Miseinen Dakedo Kodomo Janai movie comic as Isuzu Ebina

Dubbing

Animation
  (Tooniverse) – Hyun-woo Kim

References

External links
 

1986 births
Living people
Japanese male video game actors
Japanese male voice actors
Male voice actors from Fukuoka Prefecture
People from Kurume
Seiyu Award winners